Varg (also Romanized as Varak) is a village in Golian Rural District, in the Central District of Shirvan County, North Khorasan Province, Iran.

Population

At the 2006 census, its population was 595, in 157 families.

References 

Populated places in Shirvan County